Chris Brooks is Professor of Finance in the School of Accounting and Finance at the University of Bristol, United Kingdom.

Biography
Brooks was formerly Professor of Finance at the ICMA Centre, part of Henley Business School, University of Reading, and the Bayes (formerly Cass) Business School, City University London. He holds a PhD and a BA in Economics and Econometrics, both from the Department of Economics at the University of Reading. His teaching has included statistics, econometrics, asset pricing and portfolio management, corporate finance and the philosophy of research. Brooks has acted as advisor and consultant to various agencies and companies and has been on the editorial boards of numerous journals including the International Journal of Forecasting, Journal of Business Finance & Accounting, and the British Accounting Review. He was a member of the Accounting and Finance sub-panel for the 2008 Research Assessment Exercise and of the Business and Management sub-panel for the Research Excellence Framework 2014. Brooks is a former member of the Executive Committee of the Conference of Professors of Accounting and Finance and is a member of the ESRC peer review college. He has received research funding from the ESRC and from the Leverhulme Trust, amongst other funders.

Research
Brooks has diverse research interests including asset pricing, fund management, behavioural finance, financial history, and econometric analysis and modelling in finance and real estate. He is author or co-author of over 140 published articles and author or co-editor of seven books that have been cited more than 10000 times. Brooks is well known as author of the first introductory econometrics textbook targeted at finance students, Introductory Econometrics for Finance (2019, Cambridge University Press), which now is in its fourth edition and has sold over 70,000 copies worldwide since it was first published. Most of his research is available either through the Social Science Research Network (SSRN, Author ID: 14685) or at the CentAUR, University of Reading repository.

Books 
 Brooks, C. (2021) First Class Research: A guide to your research project or dissertation in accounting and finance. Finance Books, pp308. 
Brooks, C. (2021) Your PhD in accounting or finance. Finance Books, pp363.  
Brooks, C. (2019) Introductory econometrics for finance. 4th edition. Cambridge University Press, pp724  
 Bell, A., Brooks, C. and Prokopczuk, M., eds. (2013) Handbook of research methods and applications in empirical finance. Edward Elgar, Cheltenham, pp512.  
 Brooks, C. and Tsolacos, S. (2010) Real estate modelling and forecasting. Cambridge University Press, Cambridge, pp474.  
 Brooks, C. (2008) RATS handbook to accompany introductory econometrics for finance. Cambridge University Press, pp213.

Selected journal articles
Finance:

 Brooks, C.  and Williams, L. (2021) The impact of personality traits on attitude to financial risk. Research in International Business and Finance, 58. 101501. ISSN 0275-5319 doi: https://doi.org/10.1016/j.ribaf.2021.101501
Critical Perspectives on Accounting. ISSN 1045-2354 doi: https://doi.org/10.1016/j.cpa.2021.102381 (In Press)
 Rendall, S., Brooks, C.  and Hillenbrand, C.  (2021) The impacts of emotions and personality on borrowers’ abilities to manage their debts. International Review of Financial Analysis. 101703. ISSN 1057-5219 doi: https://doi.org/10.1016/j.irfa.2021.101703
 Hillenbrand, C., Saraeva, A., Money, K. and Brooks, C.  (2021) Saving for a rainy day… or a trip to the Bahamas? How the framing of investment communication impacts retail investors. British Journal of Management. ISSN 1467-8551 doi: https://doi.org/10.1111/1467-8551.12455
 Brooks, C.  and Schopohl, L.  (2021) Green accounting and finance: advancing research on environmental disclosure, value impacts and management control systems. The British Accounting Review, 53 (1). 100973. ISSN 0890-8389 doi: https://doi.org/10.1016/j.bar.2020.100973
 Tao, R., Brooks, C.  and Bell, A.  (2020) Tomorrow’s fish and chip paper? Slowly incorporated news and the cross-section of stock returns. European Journal of Finance. ISSN 1466-4364 doi: https://doi.org/10.1080/1351847X.2020.1846575
 Hillenbrand, C., Saraeva, A., Money, K. and Brooks, C. (2020) To invest or not to invest? The roles of product information, attitudes towards finance and life variables in retail investor propensity to engage with financial products. British Journal of Management, 31 (4). pp. 688-708. ISSN 1467-8551 doi: https://doi.org/10.1111/1467-8551.12348
 Tao, R., Brooks, C. and Bell, A. R. (2020) When is a MAX not the MAX? How news resolves information uncertainty. Journal of Empirical Finance, 57. pp. 33-51. ISSN 0927-5398 doi: https://doi.org/10.1016/j.jempfin.2020.03.002
 Bell, A., Brooks, C. and Killick, H. (2019) A reappraisal of the freehold property market in late medieval England. Continuity and Change, 34 (3). pp. 287-313. ISSN 1469-218X doi: https://doi.org/10.1017/S0268416019000316
 Rocciolo, F., Gheno, A. and Brooks, C. (2019) Optimism, volatility and decision-making in stock markets. International Review of Financial Analysis, 66. 101356. ISSN 1057-5219 doi: https://doi.org/10.1016/j.irfa.2019.05.007
 Hillenbrand, C., Money, K. G., Brooks, C. and Tovstiga, N. (2019) Corporate tax: what do stakeholders expect? Journal of Business Ethics, 158 (2). pp. 403-426. ISSN 1573-0697 doi: https://doi.org/10.1007/s10551-017-3700-6
 Bell, A. R. and Brooks, C. (2019) Is there a ‘magic link’ between research activity, professional teaching qualifications and student satisfaction? Higher Education Policy, 32 (2). pp. 227-248. ISSN 1740-3863 doi: https://doi.org/10.1057/s41307-018-0081-0
 Brooks, C., Fenton, E., Schopohl, L. and Walker, J. (2019) Why does research in finance have so little impact? Critical Perspectives on Accounting, 58. pp. 24-52. ISSN 1045-2354 doi: https://doi.org/10.1016/j.cpa.2018.04.005

 Brooks, C., Sangiorgi, I., Hillenbrand, C. and Money, K. (2019) Experience wears the trousers: exploring gender and attitude to financial risk. Journal of Economic Behavior & Organization, 163. pp. 483-515. ISSN 0167-2681 doi: https://doi.org/10.1016/j.jebo.2019.04.026

 Brooks, C., Hoepner, A. G. F., McMillan, D., Vivian, A. and Wese Simen, C. (2019) Financial data science: the birth of a new financial research paradigm complementing econometrics? European Journal of Finance, 25 (17). pp. 1627-1636. ISSN 1466-4364 doi: https://doi.org/10.1080/1351847x.2019.1662822

Brooks, C., Sangiorgi, I., Hillenbrand, C. and Money, K.  (2018) Why are older investors less willing to take financial risks?    International Review of Financial Analysis, 56.             pp. 52–72.  ISSN 1057-5219  doi: https://doi.org/10.1016/j.irfa.2017.12.008
 Brooks, C. and Schopohl, L.  (2018) Topics and trends in finance research: what is published, who publishes it and what gets cited?  The British Accounting Review.                ISSN 0890-8389  doi: https://doi.org/10.1016/j.bar.2018.02.0
 Brooks, C., Chen, Z. and Zeng, Y.  (2018) Institutional cross-ownership and corporate strategy: the case of mergers and acquisitions.  Journal of Corporate Finance, 48.             pp. 187–216. ISSN 0929-1199  doi: https://doi.org/10.1016/j.jcorpfin.2017.11.003
 Bell, A. R. and Brooks, C.  (2018) Is there a ‘Magic Link’ between research activity, professional teaching qualifications and student satisfaction? Higher Education Policy.              ISSN 1740-3863  doi: https://doi.org/10.1057/s41307-018-0081-0
 Brooks, C. and Oikonomou, I.  (2018) The effects of environmental, social and governance disclosures and performance on firm value: a review of the literature in accounting and finance.    The British Accounting Review, 50 (1). pp. 1–15. ISSN 0890-8389  doi: https://doi.org/10.1016/j.bar.2017.11.005
 Hillenbrand, C., Money, K. G., Brooks, C. and Tovstiga, N.  (2017) Corporate tax: what do stakeholders expect? Journal of Business Ethics. ISSN 1573-0697  doi: https://doi.org/10.1007/s10551-017-3700-6
 Brooks, C.  (2017) The impact of foreign real estate investment on land prices: evidence from Mauritius.    Review of Development Economics, 21 (4). e131-e146. ISSN 1467-9361  doi: https://doi.org/10.1111/rode.12316
 Bell, A. R. and Brooks, C.  (2017) What makes students satisfied? A discussion and analysis of the UK’s national student survey. Journal of Further and Higher Education.                       ISSN 1469-9486  doi: https://doi.org/10.1080/0309877X.2017.1349886
 Brooks, C., Balatti, M. and Kappou, K.  (2017) Fundamental indexation revisited: new evidence on alpha.    International Review of Financial Analysis, 51. pp. 1–15. ISSN 1057-5219  doi: https://doi.org/10.1016/j.irfa.2017.02.010
 Brooks, C., Godfrey, C., Hillenbrand, C. and Money, K. (2016) Do investors care about corporate tax? Journal of Corporate Finance, 38. pp. 218–248. ISSN 0929-1199 doi: 10.1016/j.jcorpfin.2016.01.013
 Brooks, C., Fernandez-Perez, A., Miffre, J. and Nneji, O. (2016) Commodity risks and the cross-section of equity returns. The British Accounting Review, 48 (2). pp. 134–150. ISSN 0890-8389 doi: 10.1016/j.bar.2016.03.001
 Brooks, C., Burke, S. P. and Stanescu, S. (2016) Finite sample weighting of recursive forecast errors. International Journal of Forecasting, 32 (2). pp. 458–474. ISSN 0169-2070 doi: 10.1016/j.ijforecast.2015.05.003
 Brooks, C., Prokopczuk, M. and Wu, Y. (2015) Booms and busts in commodity markets: bubbles or fundamentals?Journal of Futures Markets, 35 (10). pp. 916–938. ISSN 1096-9934 doi: 10.1002/fut.21721
 Oikonomou, I., Brooks, C. and Pavelin, S. (2014) The financial effects of uniform and mixed corporate social performance. Journal of Management Studies, 51(6). pp. 898–925.  doi: 10.1111/joms.12064
 Anderson, K. and Brooks, C. (2014) Speculative bubbles and the cross-sectional variation in stock returns. International Review of Financial Analysis, 35. pp. 20–31. ISSN 1057-5219 doi: 10.1016/j.irfa.2014.07.004
 Miffre, J. and Brooks, C. (2013) Do long-short speculators destabilise commodity futures markets? International Review of Financial Analysis, 30. pp. 230–240.  doi: 10.1016/j.irfa.2013.09.002
 Miffre, J., Brooks, C. and Li, X. (2013) Idiosyncratic volatility and the pricing of poorly-diversified portfolios. International Review of Financial Analysis, 30. pp. 78–85.  doi: 10.1016/j.irfa.2013.05.007
 Brooks, C., Cerny, A. and Miffre, J. (2012) Optimal hedging with higher moments. Journal of Futures Markets, 32 (10). pp. 909–944.  doi: 10.1002/fut.20542
 Anderson, K., Brooks, C. and Katsaris, A. (2010) Speculative bubbles in the S&P 500: was the tech bubble confined to the tech sector? Journal of Empirical Finance, 17 (3). pp. 345–361.  doi: 10.1016/j.jempfin.2009.12.004
 Brammer, S., Brooks, C. and Pavelin, S. (2006) Corporate social performance and stock returns: UK evidence from disaggregate measures. Financial Management, 35 (3). pp. 97–116.  doi: 10.1111/j.1755-053X.2006.tb00149.x
 Anderson, K. and Brooks, C. (2006) The long-term price-earnings ratio. Journal of Business Finance and Accounting, 33 (7–8). pp. 1063–1086.  doi: 10.1111/j.1468-5957.2006.00621.x
 Brooks, C. and Katsaris, A. (2005) A three-regime model of speculative behaviour: modelling the evolution of the S&P 500 composite index. The Economic Journal, 115 (505). pp. 767–797.  doi: 10.1111/j.1468-0297.2005.01019.x
 Shields, K., Olekalns, N., Henry, Ó. T. and Brooks, C. (2005) Measuring the response of macroeconomic uncertainty to shocks. Review of Economics and Statistics, 87 (2). pp. 362–370.  doi: 10.1162/0034653053970276
 Brooks, C., Clare, A. D., Dalle Molle, J. W. and Persand, G. (2005) A comparison of extreme value theory approaches for determining value at risk. Journal of Empirical Finance, 12 (2). pp. 339–352.  doi: 10.1016/j.jempfin.2004.01.004
 Brooks, C., Burke, S. P., Heravi, S. and Persand, G. (2005) Autoregressive conditional kurtosis. Journal of Financial Econometrics, 3 (3). pp. 399–421.  doi: 10.1093/jjfinec/nbi018
 Brooks, C. and Katsaris, A. (2005) Trading rules from forecasting the collapse of speculative bubbles for the S&P 500 composite index. Journal of Business, 78 (5). pp. 2003–2036. 

Real Estate:
 Bell, A. R., Brooks, C. and Taylor, N. (2016) Time-varying price discovery in the eighteenth century: empirical evidence from the London and Amsterdam stock markets. Cliometrica Journal of Historical Economics and Econometric History, 10 (1). pp. 5–30. ISSN 1863-2505 doi: 10.1007/s11698-014-0120-z
 Nneji, O., Brooks, C. and Ward, C. (2015) Speculative bubble spillovers across regional housing markets. Land Economics, 91 (3). pp. 516–535. ISSN 1543-8325 doi: 10.3368/le.91.3.516
 Nneji, O., Brooks, C. and Ward, C. (2013) Commercial real estate and equity market bubbles: are they contagious to REITs? Urban Studies, 50 (12). pp. 2496–2516.  doi: 10.1177/0042098013477700
 Nneji, O., Brooks, C. and Ward, C. (2013) Intrinsic and rational speculative bubbles in the US housing market 1960–2011. Journal of Real Estate Research, 35 (2). pp. 121–151. 
 Anderson, K., Brooks, C. and Tsolacos, S. (2011) Testing for periodically collapsing rational speculative bubbles in US REITs. Journal of Real Estate Portfolio Management, 17 (3). pp. 227–241. 

History:
 Bell, A. R., Brooks, C. and Killick, H. (2019) Medieval property investors, ca. 1300-1500. Enterprise and Society, 20 (3). pp. 575-612. ISSN 1467-2235 doi: https://doi.org/10.1017/eso.2018.92
Bell, A. R., Brooks, C. and Moore, T. K. (2017) Cambium non est mutuum: exchange and interest rates in medieval Europe. The Economic History Review, 70 (2). pp. 373–396. ISSN 1468-0289 doi: 10.1111/ehr.12374 
 Bell, A. R., Brooks, C. and Moore, T. K.  (2017) Did purchasing power parity hold in medieval Europe? The Manchester School, 85 (6). pp. 682–709. ISSN 1467-9957  doi: https://doi.org/10.1111/manc.12167 
 Bell, A. R., Brooks, C. and Moore, T. K. (2016) Did purchasing power parity hold in medieval Europe? The Manchester School. ISSN 1467-9957 doi: 10.1111/manc.12167 
 Bell, A. R., Brooks, C. and Moore, T. K. (2014) The credit relationship between Henry III and merchants of Douai and Ypres, 1247–70. Economic History Review, 67 (1). pp. 123–145.  doi: 10.1111/1468-0289.12013 
 Bell, A. R., Brooks, C. and Moore, T. K. (2009) Interest in Medieval accounts: examples from England, 1272–1340. History, 94 (316). pp. 411–433.  doi: 10.1111/j.1468-229X.2009.00464.x
 Bell, A. R., Brooks, C. and Dryburgh, P. R. (2007) Interest rates and efficiency in medieval wool forward contracts. Journal of Banking & Finance, 31 (2). pp. 361–380.  doi: 10.1016/j.jbankfin.2006.04.006

References

British economists
Living people
Alumni of the University of Reading
Econometricians
Year of birth missing (living people)
Academics of the University of Bristol
British financial writers
British statisticians